The 2011 Castilian-Leonese regional election was held on Sunday, 22 May 2011, to elect the 8th Cortes of the autonomous community of Castile and León. All 84 seats in the Cortes were up for election. The election was held simultaneously with regional elections in twelve other autonomous communities and local elections all throughout Spain.

The election saw the People's Party (PP), which had formed the government of the region since the second democratic election in 1987, winning its largest majority to date with over 63% of the seats at stake (53 out of 84 seats), with incumbent president Juan Vicente Herrera being subsequently re-elected for a fourth term in office. The opposition Spanish Socialist Workers' Party (PSOE) and Leonese People's Union (UPL) both lost ground, with the former securing its worst result since 1995, whereas United Left (IU) re-entered parliament for the first time since the 1999 election. The new Union, Progress and Democracy (UPyD) party, while achieving a remarkable result for a first-time national party with 3.3% of the share (and scoring in third place in the Ávila and Burgos constituencies), failed to obtain any seats.

Overview

Electoral system
The Cortes of Castile and León were the devolved, unicameral legislature of the autonomous community of Castile and León, having legislative power in regional matters as defined by the Spanish Constitution and the Castilian-Leonese Statute of Autonomy, as well as the ability to vote confidence in or withdraw it from a regional president.

Voting for the Cortes was on the basis of universal suffrage, which comprised all nationals over 18 years of age, registered in Castile and León and in full enjoyment of their political rights. Amendments to the electoral law in 2011 required for Castilian-Leonese people abroad to apply for voting before being permitted to vote, a system known as "begged" or expat vote. All members of the Cortes of Castile and León were elected using the D'Hondt method and a closed list proportional representation, with an electoral threshold of three percent of valid votes—which included blank ballots—being applied in each constituency. Seats were allocated to constituencies, corresponding to the provinces of Ávila, Burgos, León, Palencia, Salamanca, Segovia, Soria, Valladolid and Zamora, with each being allocated an initial minimum of three seats, as well as one additional member per each 45,000 inhabitants or fraction greater than 22,500.

The use of the D'Hondt method might result in a higher effective threshold, depending on the district magnitude.

Election date
After legal amendments in 2007, fixed-term mandates were abolished, instead allowing the term of the Cortes of Castile and León to expire after an early dissolution. The election Decree was required to be issued no later than the twenty-fifth day prior to the date of expiry of parliament and published on the following day in the Official Gazette of Castile and León, with election day taking place between the fifty-fourth and sixtieth days from publication. The previous election was held on 27 May 2007, which meant that the legislature's term would have expired on 27 May 2011. The election Decree was required to be published no later than 3 May 2011, with the election taking place up to the sixtieth day from publication, setting the latest possible election date for the Cortes on Saturday, 2 July 2011.

The president had the prerogative to dissolve the Cortes of Castile and León and call a snap election, provided that no motion of no confidence was in process and that dissolution did not occur either during the first legislative session or before one year had elapsed since a previous dissolution. In the event of an investiture process failing to elect a regional president within a two-month period from the first ballot, the Cortes were to be automatically dissolved and a fresh election called.

Parliamentary composition
The Cortes of Castile and León were officially dissolved on 29 March 2011, after the publication of the dissolution decree in the Official Gazette of Castile and León. The table below shows the composition of the parliamentary groups in the Cortes at the time of dissolution.

Parties and candidates
The electoral law allowed for parties and federations registered in the interior ministry, coalitions and groupings of electors to present lists of candidates. Parties and federations intending to form a coalition ahead of an election were required to inform the relevant Electoral Commission within ten days of the election call, whereas groupings of electors needed to secure the signature of at least one percent of the electorate in the constituencies for which they sought election, disallowing electors from signing for more than one list of candidates.

Below is a list of the main parties and electoral alliances which contested the election:

Opinion polls
The tables below list opinion polling results in reverse chronological order, showing the most recent first and using the dates when the survey fieldwork was done, as opposed to the date of publication. Where the fieldwork dates are unknown, the date of publication is given instead. The highest percentage figure in each polling survey is displayed with its background shaded in the leading party's colour. If a tie ensues, this is applied to the figures with the highest percentages. The "Lead" column on the right shows the percentage-point difference between the parties with the highest percentages in a poll.

Voting intention estimates
The table below lists weighted voting intention estimates. Refusals are generally excluded from the party vote percentages, while question wording and the treatment of "don't know" responses and those not intending to vote may vary between polling organisations. When available, seat projections determined by the polling organisations are displayed below (or in place of) the percentages in a smaller font; 43 seats were required for an absolute majority in the Cortes of Castile and León (42 until 1 January 2010).

Voting preferences
The table below lists raw, unweighted voting preferences.

Preferred President
The table below lists opinion polling on leader preferences to become president of the Junta of Castile and León.

Results

Overall

Distribution by constituency

Aftermath

References
Opinion poll sources

Other

2011 in Castile and León
Castile and León
Regional elections in Castile and León
May 2011 events in Europe